is a Japanese manga artist from Kushima in Miyazaki Prefecture. In 2010, she won the 34th Kodansha Manga Award for Best  Manga for Princess Jellyfish. In 2015, she won both the 8th Manga Taishō and the Grand Prize at the 19th Japan Media Arts Festival for Blank Canvas: My So-Called Artist's Journey. In 2019, she won the Eisner Award for Best U.S. Edition of International Material—Asia for Tokyo Tarareba Girls. Higashimura's younger brother, Takuma Morishige, is the author of the manga My Neighbor Seki.

Works

  (2001–present, Shueisha)
  (2006–2010, Kodansha)
  (2007–2011, Shueisha)
  (2008–2017, Kodansha)
  (2010–2012, Kodansha)
  (2011–2015, Shueisha)
  (2013–2014, Kodansha)
  (2014–2017, Kodansha)
  (2015–present, Shueisha)
  (2015, Kodansha, suspended)
 (2015–2020, Shogakukan)
 (2017–2019, Bungeishunjū)
 (2017–2018, Kodansha)
 (2018–2021, with Mariko Hayashi, Shueisha)
 (2018, Kodansha)
 (2019–2021, Kodansha)
 (2019, Shogakukan)
 (2020–present, Piccoma)

Notes

References

Further reading

External links
 

1975 births
Women manga artists
Living people
Manga artists from Miyazaki Prefecture
Japanese female comics artists
Female comics writers
21st-century Japanese women writers
Manga Taishō